Henrik Prip (born 31 March 1960) is a Danish actor. He appeared in more than sixty films since 1994.

Selected filmography

Henrik Prip

References

External links
 

1960 births
Living people
Danish male film actors
Danish male television actors
People from Gentofte Municipality
20th-century Danish male actors
21st-century Danish male actors